Sajjarud Rural District is a rural district (dehestan) in Bandpey-ye Sharqi District, Babol County, Mazandaran Province, Iran. At the 2006 census, its population was 26,809, in 6,738 families. The rural district has 135 villages.

References 

Rural Districts of Mazandaran Province
Babol County